Joakim "Jocke" Rask (born 8 January 1972) is a Swedish professional golfer.

Rask's father, a scratch golfer, taught him to play as a six-year-old and he represented the Swedish boys' team. Rask concentrated on golf after an ice-hockey injury, and turned professional in 1992 at the age of 20. He won a Challenge Tour event in his first season, and he had a great 1996 season, which saw him hold the number one rankings position for several weeks in the mid-to-late part of the season, and graduated to the European Tour.

Rask played 63 events on the European Tour 1997–2015 where his best performance was ninth at the 2001 North West of Ireland Open. His biggest check came with his tie for fourth at the 2014 Kazakhstan Open on the Challenge Tour.

Professional wins (11)

Challenge Tour wins (3)

Nordic Golf League wins (8)

References

External links

Swedish male golfers
European Tour golfers
People from Katrineholm Municipality
Golfers from Stockholm
1972 births
Living people